Dichloropropane can refer to any of several chemical compounds:

 1,1-Dichloropropane
 1,2-Dichloropropane
 1,3-Dichloropropane
 2,2-Dichloropropane